Ted Murphy (born 3 August 1947) is  a former Australian rules footballer who played with Richmond in the Victorian Football League (VFL).

Notes

External links 		
		
		
		
		
		
		
Living people		
1947 births		
		
Australian rules footballers from Victoria (Australia)		
Richmond Football Club players